Polonia Technica, Inc., also known as Association of Polish-American Engineers
is a non-profit organization, established in 1941 in New York City, 
by a group of Polish engineers, who, after the outbreak of the World War II, found
themselves in the United States of America. The organization serves as a professional and social link for Polish engineers and technicians living in the United States.

Referenced by Consulate General of the Republic of Poland in New York, it is also related to Polish Assistance Inc. in New York.

History 
Founded in 1941. The organization contributed to initiation of Studia 4U program coordinated by PSO (Polish Student Organization).

Publications 
Polish American Engineers Association, 2006 Recognition Award Banquet

Events 
2011-09-19: Studia 4U 2011 wspolorganizowane przez Polonia Technica oraz Polish Student Organization z Nowego Jorku

2011-05-13: 70-years of Polonia Technica celebrated on May 13 through 15th, 2011

2011-01-09: Walne Zebranie Sprawozdawczo-Wyborcze

2010-12-17: Inter-organizational holiday party 2010 in Polish Consulate, NYC

 
2010-12-12: 65-lecie Naczelnej Organizacji Technicznej NOT w Warszawie

2010-10-03: Pulaski Parade 2010

2010-09-08 through 2010-09-10: World Convention of Polish Engineers in Warsaw, Poland

2009-12-03 through 2009-12-04: 10th Polish - American Conference on Science and Technology

Latest News 
 Polonia Technica, Inc. and other Polish-American engineers had a strong presence at the World Convention of Polish Engineers, Warsaw 8–10 September 2010. Odwiedzili Politechnikę po latach is a title of a video report by Piotr Rytel and Bartłomiej Kowalski  from TVPW, which shows an overview of that successful event as well as interviews with the most prominent individuals of Polish engineering industry both in Poland and internationally.
 The Kosciuszko Foundation - Petition on German Concentration Camps: Petition on German Concentration Camps

Sources 
 Archives of Polonia Technica: www.polonia-technica.org

Jan Czekajewski - supporting member

References 

Polish-American history